Shanghai Pride was an annual LGBT pride event held in Shanghai, China from 2009 to 2020. It was the first and largest LGBT event to take place in mainland China.

Event history

In 2009, the event was held for the first time from 7 to 13 June 2009. The event was celebrated as a pride festival with cultural events in private venues. The event was framed as an entertaining party for foreigners without a public parade in order to avoid official attention.  Organizers stated that this was the first LGBT festival in China; there are individuals, mostly Chinese LGBT activists, who say that there were organized LGBT events that occurred prior to Shanghai Pride.

The festival featured events such as an art exhibition and film screenings. There was also a large party hosted by a privately owned venue. Three thousand people from China and other countries attended the festival. There was also to be a raffle to raise money for the Chiheng Foundation AIDS Orphans project.

In 2010 the event was held during October, directly following the closing days of the Shanghai Expo, over a 3-week period.

In 2011 the event was again held during October, this time in over 9 days. 

For the 2012 event, the organisers have announced that it will move back to June and be held over 9 days.

2018 Shanghai Pride celebrated its 10th year.

The event in 2019 was held from 18 May to 16 June.

 The first event was the Rainbow Bike Pride. The 2019 Shanghai Pride Rainbow Bike Ride was held Saturday 18 May to commemorate International Day Against Homophobia, Transphobia and Biphobia (IDAHOTB). Six teams set off from every corner of Shanghai, snaking through the city via different routes before converging at Cotton's – an F&B venue located on Xinhua Road. Each of the six teams represented one color of the rainbow flag. Riders gathered at the starting point decked in Pride T-shirts and sporting customized Pride backpacks. After the opening remarks and group photos, each team set off, hearts pumping with pride to ride in support of the LGBT community. Between 10:30 am and 11:30 am, the six teams arrived at Cotton's in quick succession. A team of volunteers were waiting to welcome them, taking group photos for them and arranging a place for much needed rest.
 After the Rainbow Bike Pride, multiple film festivals and art exhibitions. In the film festivals, various LGBT themed movies were shown. In the art exhibitions (Pride Art), the public was asked to submit artwork that showcases self-identity, diversity, and Pride, in order for it to be showcased it the exhibition.
 On 13 June, the Shanghai Pride Out & Equal Conference was held. For a second year, Shanghai Pride partnered with Out & Equal Workplace Advocates to discuss how to advance LGBT workplace diversity and inclusion. Over 100 companies attended this year's forum doubling the attendance from the previous year.
 On the same day, there was a Ladies' Party. 
 On 15 June, the annual Pride Run took place. Seven separate teams, from seven different starting points, ran towards Andaz Xintiandi, Shanghai, where a brunch buffet awaited the runners. All participants received a Pride Run medal, a Nike Be True T-shirt and a mystery goody bag.

The event was ended in 2020  as a result of the authorities’ increasing clampdown on civil society and LGBTQ rights in the country.

Organization development
The festival was organised by volunteers from the Shanghai LGBT community. During its conception in 2009, the event planning, partnerships and execution were led by two American women Tiffany Lemay and Hannah Miller, who had resided in Shanghai for several years. Their status as outsiders created an advantage to hosting the festival, and reduced the potential for government interference. Miller, a lesbian living in the city since 2001, views Shanghai as "undoubtedly China's most liberal and progressive city", which is thus the reasoning for them hosting the festival in the city. Lemay said: '...last year, we saw the Beijing Olympics described as "China's coming out" party. Now China is really coming out – this time from the closet'.

In 2010, with the event now established, there was greater collaboration between local LGBT groups and other organizations. This has continued during the planning period in 2011 and 2012.

Language and ethnic demographics
The 2009 Shanghai Pride event was only publicized in English, and its website was only in English. Most of the organizers were white people who originated from Western countries and were of the middle class, and therefore most of the participants were from the same demographic. One reason why the 2009 event had these demographics was because the working language of the Shanghai LGBT Group was English; foreign expatriates had established the groups. In addition, the publicity was only in English to avoid causing the Chinese government to enact additional restrictions or control. While initially English only, the Shanghai Pride website was later available both in English and Chinese. The organization had also put effort into attracting the Chinese crowd in order to facilitate the integration between the LGBT Chinese and the LGBT expatriates.

See also
 LGBT culture in Shanghai
 Homosexuality in China
 Human rights in China

Notes

References

External links
 
 ShanghaiPRIDE Blog
GayShanghai.com, Gay Guide to Shanghai
LaoWaiTalk.com, LGBT Community Forum

2009 establishments in China
Annual events in Shanghai
LGBT culture in Shanghai
LGBT events in the People's Republic of China
Pride parades in China
Recurring events established in 2009